Đuro Kodžo (Serbian Cyrillic: Ђуро Коџо; born 12 May 1971) is a Bosnian retired long-distance runner who specialized in the marathon. He represented Bosnia and Herzegovina at the 2000 Summer Olympics and 2001 World Championships in Athletics. He holds a national record in the half-marathon discipline.

Running career
Kodžo began training in Mrkonjić Grad with Atletski Klub "Petar Mrkonjić". By the end of his career, he would be named "Best Athlete of Mrkonjić Grad", a once-per-year recognition, on nine occasions. In the men's marathon at the 2000 Summer Olympics, Kodžo finished in 78th place out of 81 finishers in a time of 2:39:14 (hours:minutes:seconds). In the following year, he finished the men's marathon at the 2001 World Championships in Athletics in a personal-best time of 2:35:47. He also won the 2001 Podgorica Marathon in 2:30:11. 

On June 15, 2003, he ran a personal best time of 1:05:45 in Rijeka's Run Reebok Trophy half marathon. However, the course was not approved for record keeping according to the Association of Road Racing Statisticians. Less than a year later, he ran 1:06:18 at the 2004 Belgrade Half Marathon, which was his best half marathon performance on a certified course.

On October 5, 2008, Kodžo ran his fastest marathon at the 2008 Zagreb Marathon, recording a personal-best time of 2:16:45. Kodžo qualified for the 2009 World Championships in Athletics for the marathon, but the selector for Bosnia and Herzegovina's Athletic Federation, Nebojša Matijević, refused to call up Kodžo from unclear reasons, resulting in a controversy.

See also
Bosnia and Herzegovina at the 2000 Summer Olympics

References

Bosnia and Herzegovina male long-distance runners
Athletes (track and field) at the 2000 Summer Olympics
World Athletics Championships athletes for Bosnia and Herzegovina
Olympic athletes of Bosnia and Herzegovina
People from Mrkonjić Grad
1971 births
Living people
Bosnia and Herzegovina male marathon runners